Red Star Rugby League Club or origin Ragbi Liga Klub Crvena Zvezda is a Serbian rugby league club based in Belgrade and competing in the Serbian Rugby League.

Red Star Rugby League Club is member of the Red Star Sports Society.

In December 2018 it was announced that the club will play in the British based knockout competition, the 2019 Challenge Cup, on the condition that matches in the first two rounds will be played away from home.

Red Star Belgrade Rugby League Club has developed one of the strongest domestic rugby league clubs outside of the traditional rugby league heartlands of the game in the northern hemisphere through a combination of youth and local player development, with importing coaches and a small number of players with experience. This worked particularly well between 2018 and 2019 when Australians Jack O'Brien and Darcy Etrich and Scotland's Sam Herron had stints with the club. The perspective of the club's management was that overseas players would assist the development of the local players and expand their rugby league knowledge.

Due to Red Star Rugby League being unbeaten through 2018 and 2019, the club management allowed the imported players to leave the club and focused on the development of the local playing group and juniors in 2020. This was also exacerbated by the Covid-19 pandemic, with the club being forced to send Phil Economidis home, and then allowing Vladica Nikolic to return to France in late August 2020.

Red Star's future goals are to support the development of European Rugby League club competitions that are aligned with the goals of the RLEF and the Serbian Rugby League Federation.

Squad
Current Squad:

  Miloš Zogović
  Rajko Trifunović
  Denis Čengaj
  Petar Milanović
  Aleksandar Đorđević
  Vojislav Dedić
  Stefan Nedeljković
  Vuk Štrbac
  Vladislav Dedić
  Slobodan Manak
  Marko Janković
  Marko Šatev
  Nikola Đurić
  Miloš Ćalić
  Valentino Milovanović
  Uroš Martinović
  Nenad Žujić
  Miroslav Selimovski
  Balša Žarković
  Miodrag Tomić 
  Luka Trifunović
  Adam Pavlović

Honours
 Serbian Rugby League Championship
 Winners (7): 2013–14, 2017, 2018, 2019, 2020, 2021, 2022
 Serbian Rugby League Cup
 Winners (4): 2015–16, 2018, 2019, 2020
 Serbian Super Cup
 Winners (4): 2015–16, 2018, 2019, 2020
 Balkan Super League
 Winners (4): 2018, 2019, 2021, 2022

See also
 Red Star Belgrade
 SD Crvena Zvezda

References

External links
 sd-crvenazvezda.net
 rlkcrvenazvezda.com
 ragbiligesrbije.rs
Red Star Rugby League Club
Crvena zvezda
Rugby league in Serbia
Serbian rugby league teams
Rugby clubs established in 2006
2006 establishments in Serbia